The study of the settlements of the Cucuteni-Trypillia culture provides important insights into the early history of Europe. The Cucuteni-Trypillia culture, which existed in the present-day southeastern European nations of Moldova, Romania, and Ukraine during the Neolithic Age and Copper Age, from approximately 5500 to 2750 BC, left behind thousands of settlement ruins containing a wealth of archaeological artifacts attesting to their cultural and technological characteristics.

Settlements
The latest research (2014) suggests that some of the largest mega sites contained as many as 3,000 structures and with the possibility of 20,000 to 46,000 inhabitants. Maidanets may have contained almost 3,000 houses and a population of anything between 12,000 and 46,000 with 29,000 as the average population figure. Dobrovody and Talianki are estimated with populations up to 16,200 and 21,000.

In terms of overall size, some of Cucuteni-Trypillia sites, such as Talianki (with a population of 15,000 and covering an area of some 450 hectares – 1100 acres) in the Uman district of Ukraine, are as large as (or perhaps even larger than) the more famous city-states of Sumer in the Fertile Crescent, and these Eastern European settlements predate the Sumerian cities by more than half of a millennium. The reason that academicians have not designated the gigantic settlements of Cucuteni-Trypillia culture as "cities", is due to the lack of conclusive evidence for internal social differentiation or specialization. However, there is some debate among scholars whether these settlements ought to be labeled as proto-cities.

The Cucuteni-Trypillia settlements were usually located on a place where the geomorphology provided natural barriers to protect the site: most notably using high river terraces or canyon edges. The natural barriers were supplemented with fences, earthworks and ditches, or even more elaborate wooden and clay ramparts. The role of the fortifications found at these settlements was probably to protect the tribe's domestic animal herd from wild predators. Other hypotheses are that the fortifications were for protection against enemy attacks, or as a means to gather the community. The role of these fortifications, however, is still debated among scholars.

The most common arrangement of construction for Cucuteni-Trypillia settlements was to place most of the buildings in a circular pattern surrounding a central structure; some examples of this arrangements were found at Târpeşti, Ioblona, Berezivka, Onoprievka, and Răşcani. The earliest villages consisted of ten to fifteen wattle-and-daub households. In their heyday, settlements expanded to include several hundred large huts, sometimes with two stories. These houses were typically warmed by an oven, and had round windows. Some of the huts included kilns, which were used to fire the distinctive pottery for which the Cucuteni-Trypillia culture is known.

These settlements underwent periodical acts of destruction and re-creation, as they were burned and then rebuilt every 60–80 years. Some scholars have theorized that the inhabitants of these settlements believed that every house symbolized an organic, almost living, entity. Each house, including its ceramic vases, ovens, figurines and innumerable objects made of perishable materials, shared the same circle of life, and all of the buildings in the settlement were physically linked together as a larger symbolic entity. As with living beings, the settlements may have been seen as also having a life cycle of death and rebirth.

As the settlements grew larger, the houses were arranged in two elliptical rows, separated by a space of 70–100 metres (220–320 feet). Each household was almost completely self-supportive within these communities, as if instead of being located within a settlement, each family was living away from town and neighbors in the country. There was a lack of public infrastructure within these settlements, which compelled the inhabitants to include all aspects of their lives within their own domicile; ovens, kilns, working, and sleeping areas were all contained within the same space as the family’s sacred altars. Thus the buildings included both the sacred and profane, which some authorities see as evidence to support the idea that the inhabitants viewed their homes as living beings.

Largest settlements
 
 
The existence of the giant settlements was discovered in the 1960s, when the military topographer K.V. Shishkin noticed the presence of peculiar spots from certain aerial photographs.

Scholars posit two theories regarding the impetus behind the formation of the large Cucuteni-Trypillia settlements:
 That they were created in response to the threat of invaders or attacks from people of the open steppes.
 That they appeared as a result of natural development and growth, which included the threat of inter-tribal warfare from other Cucuteni-Trypillia settlements, as the population growth exerted economic and social pressures on the limited resources of the area.

Ukrainian archeologist Ivan T. Černjakov credits the large size of some of the Cucuteni-Trypillia settlements to their agricultural system, which was affected by the climatic changes over the years. This can be seen by examining the historic and modern changes in sea level of the nearby Black Sea.

Some of these large settlements include:

 Talianki, Ukraine – c. 3700 BCE – up to 21,000 inhabitants, up to 2,700 houses, and covered an area of 450 hectares (1100 acres). Talianki was the largest  Trypillia settlement around 3700 BC., after beginning of regular excavations at 1981 were explored more than 42 dwellings and few pits.
 Dobrovody, Ukraine  – c. 3800 BCE – up to 16,200 inhabitants, and covered an area of 250 hectares (600 acres, explored remains of 5 dwellings.
 Maydanets, Ukraine – c. 3700 BCE – up to 46,000 inhabitants, with 29,000 as the most plausible, (probably between 6000 and 9000 inhabitants) near 3600–3500 BCE, explored 34 houses and 12 pits (1972–1991) up to 3,000 houses, and covered an area of 270 hectares (660 acres).
 Nebelivka, Ukraine - c. 4000 BCE, up to 300 hectares (740 acres) and 15,000 residents.
A 2009 British-Ukrainian archaeological expedition, organized by John Chapman and Mykhailo Videiko, focussed on the 300 ha mega-site of Nebelivka, Kirovograd domain, enabling the production of a 15 ha geophysics plot with over 50 burnt structures and a small number of unburnt structures, as well as pits and other anomalies. Remains of one house were excavated. This settlement, dated to B II period of Trypillia Culture, was the largest around 4000 BCE.

With the mega settlements of the Cucuteni-Trypillia culture starting in 4300 BCE the period of very large settlements would continue for almost 2,000 years. To date (2014) more than 2,440 Cucuteni-Trypillia settlements are discovered so far in Moldova, Ukraine and Romania. 194 (8%) of these settlements had an area of more than 10 hectares between 5000–2700 BCE and more than 29 settlements had an area in the range 100–450 hectares and 2,800 houses.

The settlements were primarily administrative, military and religious centres and not for crafts. The typical Trypillia hierarchy was one dominant "capital" with a population up to 15,000 people and more than 100 hectares, this capital was surrounded by satellite towns typically in the size range 10–40 hectares and villages in the range of 2–7 hectares. The Capital controlled territories as far away as 20 km (12,5 mi) from the center.

The latest research indicates that the settlements had three level settlement hierarchy, with the possibility of state-level societies. An excavated mega-structures suggests the presence of public buildings for meetings or ceremonies.

The following are a list with the largest settlements with approximate time of peak population. Remember, population estimates of ancient settlements should always be taken with caution, with different interpretations depending on the scholar.

Ultimately, the large scale of the Cucuteni-Trypillia settlements may have contributed to the downfall of their society, according to a theory that attributes their collapse to ecological factors. Due to a dramatic worldwide climate change around 3200 BCE, the area of the Cucuteni-Trypillia culture would have been plunged into a devastating "Dust Bowl" type of drought. With their reliance on agriculture to produce food, feeding the many inhabitants of these large-scale settlements would have been unsustainable, leading to the dramatic end of the Cucuteni-Trypillia farming society, and replaced by the more drought-appropriate pastoral nomadic society of the Proto-Indo-Europeans that followed.

More recent research based on the geophysical survey and excavation of a number of the large settlements or 'megasites' suggests that these declined in part due to a process of social fissioning as emerging hierarchical decision-making models were rejected by communities politically organized into autonomous segmented lineages.

See also
Prehistoric Romania
History of Ukraine
Prehistory of Southeastern Europe
Neolithic Europe
Chalcolithic Europe

References

External links
Cucuteni Culture The French Government's Ministry of Culture's page on Cucuteni Culture (in English).

Cucuteni–Trypillia culture
Stone Age Europe
Prehistory of Southeastern Europe
Former populated places in Moldova
Archaeological sites in Romania
Former populated places in Romania
Archaeological sites in Ukraine